Carol Anmuth Nemeyer (January 29, 1929 – June 30, 2008) was an American librarian and a president of the American Library Association from 1982 to 1983. she married Lieutenant Commander Sheldon Nemeyer on September 23, 1950.

As ALA president, Nemeyer set up a commission to "call national attention to problems threatening broad and equal opportunities for public access to information, including obvious questions of library support."  The Commission on Freedom and Equality of Access to Information was chaired by Dan Lacy of McGraw-Hill.

Nemeyer graduated from Berea College and Columbia University's School of Library Service. She worked as the librarian at the McGraw-Hill Publishing Company before she joined the staff of the Association of American Publishers in the early 1970s. In 1977, she joined the Library of Congress as the associate librarian for national programs.

Carol and her husband Sheldon Nemeyer retired in 1986 and lived on a boat, sailing the Caribbean from Fort Lauderdale, Florida.

References

 
 

1929 births
2008 deaths
American librarians
American women librarians
Presidents of the American Library Association
Librarians at the Library of Congress
Berea College alumni
Columbia University School of Library Service alumni
20th-century American women
20th-century American people
21st-century American women